Darnell Stephens (born January 29, 1973) is a former American football linebacker. He played for the Tampa Bay Buccaneers from 1995 to 1996.

References

1973 births
Living people
American football linebackers
Clemson Tigers football players
Tampa Bay Buccaneers players
Judson High School alumni